Streptomyces pseudoechinosporeus is a bacterium species from the genus of Streptomyces which has been isolated from sandy desert soil. Microellobosporia grisea was transferred to Streptomyces pseudoechinosporeus.

See also 
 List of Streptomyces species

References

Further reading

External links
Type strain of Streptomyces pseudoechinosporeus at BacDive -  the Bacterial Diversity Metadatabase

pseudoechinosporeus
Bacteria described in 1986